Bhagwangarh, also known as Bhukhianwali is a village of Talwandi Sabo tehsil of Bathinda district of Indian Panjab.

Location
Bhagwangarh is surrounded by Bathinda Tehsil, Dabwali Tehsil, Giddedrbaha Tehsil and Lambi Tehsil.

Geography 

Demographics 

Punjabi is the mother tongue and Sikhism is the dominant religion of the village with other minorities. As of 2011 census, the total population of the village is 2659 with 546 households, 1413 males and 1246 females. The sex ratio is 882 females per 1000 males, with children sex ratio of 847. The literacy rate of the village is 61.85% with male literacy 69.50% and female, 53.20%. Jatt is dominant caste of the village with Schedule Caste (SC) constitutes the 34.45% of the population and no Schedule Tribe (ST) population.

Transportation
The village is about 19 km from Bathinda. The distance to Chandigarh is 232 km.  
The nearest railway station is Sangat Rail Way Station.

Nearby places
 Sangat Mandi
 Talwandi Sabo (Sri Damdma Sahib)
 Mandi Dabwali
 Giddarbaha
 Kalan Wali

Post Offices
 Sangat. Pincode.151401
 Sirkibazar. Pincode.151005
 Bathinda. Pincode. 151001

Education
 Guru Nanak College, Doomwali.
 Eastwood SChool, Doomwali. 
 Mastermind school, Bangi Rughu.      
 clay India international school.

Personalities 
Gurmel Singh Dhillon, a noted Punjabi songwriter are from this village.

References

Villages in Bathinda district